Where in Space Is Carmen Sandiego? (also with a Deluxe suffix) is an educational video game by Broderbund and Electronic Arts.

Gameplay
With only minor aesthetic changes to the interface, the game is familiar to anyone who played the previous entrants.  Each investigation follows a variation on the classic Carmen Sandiego formula: Sandiego or one of her gang has stolen something, and players need to collect evidence across the Solar System in order to obtain an arrest warrant before capturing the villain de jour.  Research into topics of space exploration—classical astronomy, constellations, contemporary exploratory efforts (e.g. the Viking program), and more—is needed to succeed in capturing the master thief and her 14 "henchthings".  After capturing several gang members, the player will begin receiving increasingly obscure clues.

The chief of detectives issues each assignment: a valuable artifact has been stolen from somewhere in the Solar System (e.g. the Skynd crater from Umbriel, Sacajawea Patera from Venus, or Hermes' winged hat from Mercury).  After traveling to the last place the thief was seen, clues will indicate to which of 32 available locations the suspect fled, and once players search each new location for new clues, the chase continues.  Following too many incorrect leads will exhaust the player's fuel, insufficient clues will preclude an arrest warrant, and over-analysis will afford the suspect time to fully escape; all of which are a game over.

The game's built-in database (VAL 9000) not only contains data on the Solar System and space exploration (with digitized NASA photographs), but also criminal dossiers, a log of where the player has already been, and sarcastic commentary on the player's progress.

Development
Developed by Broderbund, Where in Space was designed by Bob Arient, John Baker, Michael Barrett, Christa Beeson, Michelle Bushneff, Jim Everson, Ken Goldstein, Lance Groody, Tom Rettig, and David Ross.

Technical specifications
Running Where in Space Is Carmen Sandiego? on an IBM PC compatible required an Intel 80386 processor (or compatible), VGA graphics, 640 kilobytes of random-access memory, eight megabytes of hard disk drive space, and DOS 3.1 or later; a sound card and mouse were recommended.  No digital rights management was built into the game.

On the Macintosh, Where in Space required ten megabytes of hard drive space.

Release
Where in Space Is Carmen Sandiego? was released contemporary with the popular Where in the World Is Carmen Sandiego? children's television game show. In the UK, Broderbund and Electronic Arts published the game in May 1993.

In 1995, University Games published a Junior Detective Edition of Where in Space. That December, The Columbian wrote that children enjoyed learning about outer space, and that Where in Space was better than other Carmen Sandiego games they had played, but that it was also "too difficult for 8 year-old kids". The Register-Guard agreed that, while more fun than other games in the franchise, it was too much for the youngest children in its advertised age bracket.

Reception

Charles Taft with PC Magazine was happy with this new outing of the already-venerable series.  Small aesthetic and gameplay changes kept players' interactions fresh, while the core gameplay stayed true to the series' formula.  Where in Space Is Carmen Sandiego? did not ship with a hard copy of encyclopedic resources, and Taft touted how the equivalent built-in Val 9000 database was available to end-users without running the game.  Clayton Walnum wrote for Compute! that not only was Where in Space a "wonderful" entrant to the series—though the few animated sequences became quickly repetitive, the VAL 9000 alone was worth the  asking price.  Computer Shopper praised the game's graphics (both original and of space), and commended the game's animation, user guide, and "well-scripted powerful musical score".  This magazine also conceded that, while fun, Where in Space could become repetitive.  Of the Macintosh version, in 1994 Dwight Silverman of The Register-Guard said  graphics are gorgeous and the script witty".

For Computer Gaming World, Charles Ardai thought the animations were great but too few, the audio was creative but became grating and repetitive, and the puzzles were fine but lost their trickiness after repetition; after questioning the relevance of the game's lessons in comparison to the previous entrants, Ardai ultimately thought that Where in Space was merely satisfactory.  As strictly a game, PC Player wasn't impressed with the game, citing the grind of the process, but they rated the game at 73/100, saying that the graphics would probably attract both children and adults.  Despite technical improvements over previous Carmen Sandiego games, PC Games only recommended Where in Space as a reference work, rating it at 69/100.  When Computer and Video Games rated the game a 65/100, they said that "it becomes boring extremely quickly".

In 2015, Bustle ranked the intro music from Where in Space as the second-best piece of music from the Carmen Sandiego franchise, behind only the theme music from the Where in the World Is Carmen Sandiego? game show.

References

1993 video games
Carmen Sandiego games
Classic Mac OS games
DOS games
single-player video games
video games set in outer space